The Yukon Ranges are a mountain range comprising the mountains in the southeastern part of the U.S. state of Alaska and most of the Yukon in Canada.

Sub-ranges
Anvil Range
Dawson Range
Miners Range
Nisling Range
Ogilvie Mountains
Nahoni Range
Pelly Mountains
Big Salmon Range
Glenlyon Range
Saint Cyr Range
Ruby Range
Russel Range
Wrangell Mountains

References

Mountain ranges of Yukon
Mountain ranges of Alaska